Diamá's ( Claudia D'Addio) discography starts 2006 with an unofficial Single "You can't stop me/Identità", recorded when she was part of the Eurovision Song Contest 2006 entry for Switzerland Six4One. Both songs were never part of an album but became part of the Six4One album. The single was physically released in Switzerland only through Phonag. Digitally it was released worldwide by Chips Records (Germany). At the time she was signed with  Jupiter Records, record label of notorious German composer and producer Ralph Siegel. Due to different views about her career both sides did not dispose picking up the option for an album. Everything was resolved in collegial manners.

After this experience she and her songwriter and longtime friend Jiameé started working on new material, but Diamá felt not ready to start an own career and wanted to discover what kind of artist she is on her own. 2007 she collaborated on many projects with DJs and worked on improving her vocal skills. 2008 she started discovering the music set in her Italian roots. Infatuated by Mediterranean sounds and instruments, today's heavy hip-hop beats or electronic elements and inspired by Italian divas such as Sophia Loren, Anna Magnani, Gina Lollobrigida or Giulietta Masina she started understanding what moves her as an artist. Her Italian hometown Caserta and her favorite city Naples both located in the Campania region of Italy furnished most of the inspiration for her debut album set to be released in 2014. Powerful images of strong Italian women inspired the look of her first album. Two young and talented photographers based in Switzerland Shpend Salihu and Basil Stücheli translated her vision into art. The album has a sad undertone due to the fact that she lost her childhood friend in a tragic accident in 2009. Her whole album is dedicated first of all to his memory.

Discography

Discography as Diamá

Discography of collaborations as Diamá

Discography as Claudia D'Addio

References

Discographies of Swiss artists